Trinitario may refer to:

 Trinitario people
 a cultivar of the cocoa bean

See also
 Trinitarios